Zagłoba may refer to:
 Onufry Zagłoba, a famous if fictional Polish noble
 Zagłoba coat of arms, a Polish coat of arms
Zagłoba, Łódź Voivodeship (central Poland)
Zagłoba, Lublin Voivodeship (east Poland)

without a diacritic mark, it may refer to:
 Zagloba (beetle), a genus of ladybugs